Arón Julio Manuel Piper Barbero (born 29 March 1997) is a Spanish actor and musician, best known for playing Ander Muñoz in the Netflix teen drama Elite.

Biography
Arón Julio Manuel Piper Barbero was born on 29 March 1997 in Berlin, Germany. His father is German and his mother is Spanish. When Piper was five years old, they moved to Spain. After residing in Catalonia for some years, his family relocated to Asturias, where he lived in Avilés and Luarca. He has studied acting and directing. He is fluent in both German and Spanish as well as in English and Catalan.

Filmography

Film

Television

Awards and nominations

Notes

References

External links
 

1997 births
Living people
21st-century German male actors
21st-century Spanish male actors
German emigrants to Spain
German male film actors
German male television actors
German people of Spanish descent
Male actors from Berlin
People from Asturias
Spanish male film actors
Spanish male television actors
Spanish people of German descent